Bukit Seguntang or Bukit Siguntang (English: Seguntang Hill or Siguntang Hill) is a 29–30 metres high small hill located at the northern bank of Musi River and within the vicinity of Palembang, capital city of South Sumatra, Indonesia. It is located around 3 kilometres north from Musi River northern bank and around four kilometres southwest from Palembang city center. The place is considered sacred by the locals and home of many archeological relics believed to be related to Srivijaya Empire, once a dominating political power around Malacca Strait (6th to 13th century AD). Today the hill gain status as an archaeological park.

In 1920s, a Buddha statue was discovered in this hill. It was discovered in pieces, the head part was discovered first, several months later the body parts were discovered, however the leg part is still missing.

The 277 cm tall statue was made from granite stone commonly found in neighboring Bangka Island. The statue followed the Amaravati style that flourished in Southern India around 2nd to 5th century CE. The style was adopted during Srivijaya era, and its origin was estimated circa 7th—8th century CE. Today it is displayed in Sultan Mahmud Badaruddin II Museum, near Kuto Besak fort.

In Seguntang Hill area also found fragments of Boddhisattva statue, a ruin of stupa made of sandstone and brick, fragment of inscription, stone statue of Boddhisattva, statue of Kuwera, and a statue of Buddha Vairocana in seated position complete with prabha (halo aura) and chattra (umbrella). The fragment of inscription is called Bukit Siguntang Inscription, mentioned about a great battle that shed a lot of blood upon Bhumi Srivijaya which means the Srivijayan Land. The inscription also mentioned about a curse for those who had done evil deed.

In the southern side of the hill lays Karanganyar site, where sherds from Tang and early Sung dynasties were found. Two stone inscriptions dated back to seventh century AD were found in its vicinity in 1920s.

Tomb complex 

Bukit Seguntang is the highest point in Palembang city. The complex is a hill with garden and large trees. On higher grounds within the complex there are some tombs linked by locals to the figures of Malay-Srivijayan royalties and heroes. There are seven Srivijayan figures entombed here:
 Raja Sigentar Alam
 Pangeran Raja Batu Api
 Putri Kembang Dadar
 Putri Rambut Selako
 Panglima Tuan Junjungan
 Panglima Bagus Kuning
 Panglima Bagus Karang

According to Malay Annals manuscript, Bukit Seguntang is believed to be the place where a demi-god hero being named Sang Sapurba descended to earth. He later become the ancestor of Malay kings that ruled kingdoms in Sumatra, Western Borneo, and Malay Peninsula. Bukit Seguntang was revered as the part of Mahameru sacred mountain in Hindu-Buddhist mythology. It is considered sacred because it was believed as the homeland of Malay people. The kings that ruled Malacca Sultanate was said to be the descendants of Sang Sapurba.

Notes

References 
 Ahmad Rapanie, Cahyo Sulistianingsih, Ribuan Nata, "Kerajaan Sriwijaya, Beberapa Situs dan Temuannya", Museum Negeri Sumatera Selatan, Dinas Pendidikan Provinsi Sumatera Selatan.

Palembang
Srivijaya
Buddhism in Indonesia
Geography of South Sumatra
Archaeological parks
Buildings and structures in South Sumatra
Tourist attractions in South Sumatra